Molo Constituency is an electoral constituency in Kenya. It is one of eleven constituencies in Nakuru County. The constituency was established for the 1988 elections, renamed from the former Nakuru West Constituency.

Members of Parliament

Locations and wards

References

External links 
Map of the constituency
Lares Trek Peru

Constituencies in Nakuru County
Constituencies in Rift Valley Province
1988 establishments in Kenya
Constituencies established in 1988